On 11 December 1962, Ronald Turpin was one of the two last people to be executed in Canada. Turpin had been convicted of the murder of Metropolitan Toronto police officer Frederick Nash, 31. On 12 February 1962, Nash pulled Turpin over for a broken taillight while the latter was fleeing from a robbery. The two men got into a shootout, and Nash suffered a fatal gunshot wound to the abdomen. Turpin was hit twice, once in the arm and once in the face, giving him a scar on his left cheek.

The method of execution was hanging, and the sentence was carried out at the Don Jail. The other prisoner simultaneously executed was Arthur Lucas, who had been convicted of an unrelated murder. When both men were informed that they would likely be the last people ever to hang in Canada, Turpin said, "Some consolation."

References

1933 births
1962 deaths
People executed for murder
Executed Canadian people
People executed by Canada by hanging
20th-century executions by Canada
Canadian people convicted of murdering police officers
People executed for murdering police officers